Gentofte station is a station on the Hillerød radial of the S-train network in Copenhagen, Denmark, served by E-trains to Hillerød/Holte and Copenhagen. It is located centrally in Gentofte municipality.

See also
 1897 Gentofte train crash
 List of railway stations in Denmark

References

S-train (Copenhagen) stations
Buildings and structures in Gentofte Municipality
Railway stations opened in 1863
1863 establishments in Denmark
Railway stations in Denmark opened in the 19th century